The Óbidos Aqueduct is a 16th-century aqueduct that spans the Portuguese municipality of Óbidos.

History
The Óbidos Aqueduct was built at the orders of Catherine of Austria in around 1570. It has been classified as a Property of Public Interest since 1962.

References
Notes

Buildings and structures in Óbidos, Portugal
Properties of Public Interest in Portugal
Aqueducts in Portugal